The ocean (also the sea or the world ocean) is the body of salt water that covers approximately 70.8% of the Earth and contains 97% of Earth's water. An ocean can also refer to any of the large bodies of water into which the world ocean is conventionally divided. Separate names are used to identify five different areas of the ocean: Pacific (the largest), Atlantic, Indian, Southern, and Arctic (the smallest). The ocean is the principal component of Earth's hydrosphere, and therefore integral to life on Earth. Acting as a huge heat reservoir, the ocean influences climate and weather patterns, the carbon cycle, and the water cycle.

Oceanographers divide the ocean into different vertical and horizontal zones based on physical and biological conditions. The pelagic zone consists of the water column from surface to ocean floor throughout the open ocean. The water column is further categorized in other zones depending on depth and on how much light is present. The photic zone includes water from the surface to a depth of 1% of the surface light (about 200 m in the open ocean), where photosynthesis can occur. This makes the photic zone the most biodiverse. Photosynthesis by plants and microscopic algae (free floating phytoplankton) creates organic matter using light, water, carbon dioxide, and nutrients. Ocean photosynthesis creates 50% of the oxygen in earth's atmosphere. This upper sunlit zone is the origin of the food supply which sustains most of the ocean ecosystem. Light penetrates to a depth of only a few hundred meters; the remaining ocean below is cold and dark. The continental shelf where the ocean approaches dry land is more shallow, with a depth of a few hundred meters or less. Human activity has a greater impact on the continental shelf.

Ocean temperatures depend on the amount of solar radiation reaching the ocean surface. Water continuously circulates in the oceans creating ocean currents. These directed movements of seawater are generated by forces acting upon the water, including temperature differences, atmospheric circulation (wind), the Coriolis effect and differences in salinity. Tidal currents originate from tides, while surface currents are caused by wind and waves. Major ocean currents include the Gulf Stream, Kuroshio Current, Agulhas Current and Antarctic Circumpolar Current. Collectively, currents move enormous amounts of water and heat around the globe. This circulation significantly impacts global climate and the uptake and redistribution of pollutants such as carbon dioxide by moving these contaminants from the surface into the deep ocean.

Ocean water contains large quantities of dissolved gases, including oxygen, carbon dioxide and nitrogen. This gas exchange takes place at the ocean surface and solubility depends on the temperature and salinity of the water. The increasing concentration of carbon dioxide in the atmosphere due to fossil fuel combustion leads to higher concentrations in ocean water, resulting in ocean acidification. The ocean provides society with important environmental services, including climate regulation. It also offers a means of trade and transport and access to food and other resources. Known to be the habitat of over 230,000 species, it may contain far more – perhaps over two million species. However, the ocean is subject to numerous human-caused environmental threats, including marine pollution, overfishing, and effects of climate change on oceans, such as ocean warming, ocean acidification, sea level rise and many more. The continental shelf and coastal waters that are most influenced by human activity are especially vulnerable.

Terminology

Ocean and sea
The terms "the ocean" or "the sea" used without specification refer to the interconnected body of salt water covering the majority of the Earth's surface. It includes the Atlantic, Pacific, Indian, Southern and Arctic Oceans. As a  general term, "the ocean" and "the sea" are often interchangeable, although speakers of British English refer to "the sea" in all cases, even when the body of water is one of the oceans.

Strictly speaking, a "sea" is a body of water (generally a division of the world ocean) partly or fully enclosed by land. The word "sea" can also be used for many specific, much smaller bodies of seawater, such as the North Sea or the Red Sea. There is no sharp distinction between seas and oceans, though generally seas are smaller, and are often partly (as marginal seas) or wholly (as inland seas) bordered by land.

World ocean

The contemporary concept of the World Ocean was coined in the early 20th century by the Russian oceanographer Yuly Shokalsky to refer to the continuous ocean that covers and encircles most of Earth. The global, interconnected body of salt water is sometimes referred to as the world ocean, global ocean or the great ocean. The concept of a continuous body of water with relatively free interchange among its parts is of fundamental importance to oceanography.

Etymology
The word ocean comes from the figure in classical antiquity, Oceanus (Ōkeanós), the elder of the Titans in classical Greek mythology. Oceanus was believed by the ancient Greeks and Romans to be the divine personification of an enormous river encircling the world.

The concept of Ōkeanós has an Indo-European connection. Greek Ōkeanós has been compared to the Vedic epithet ā-śáyāna-, predicated of the dragon Vṛtra-, who captured the cows/rivers. Related to this notion, the Okeanos is represented with a dragon-tail on some early Greek vases.

Natural history

Origin of water

Scientists believe that a sizable quantity of water would have been in the material that formed the Earth. Water molecules would have escaped Earth's gravity more easily when it was less massive during its formation. This is called atmospheric escape.

During planetary formation Earth possibly had magma oceans. Subsequently outgassing, volcanic activity and meteorite impacts, according to current theories, produced an early atmosphere of carbon dioxide, nitrogen and water vapor.
The gases and with them the atmosphere are thought to have accumulated over millions of years and after Earth's surface had significantly cooled the water vapor over time would have condensed, forming Earth's first oceans. The early oceans might have been significantly hotter than today and appeared green due to high iron content.

Geological evidence helps constrain the time frame for liquid water existing on Earth. A sample of pillow basalt (a type of rock formed during an underwater eruption) was recovered from the Isua Greenstone Belt and provides evidence that water existed on Earth 3.8 billion years ago. In the Nuvvuagittuq Greenstone Belt, Quebec, Canada, rocks dated at 3.8 billion years old by one study and 4.28 billion years old by another show evidence of the presence of water at these ages. If oceans existed earlier than this, any geological evidence either has yet to be discovered or has since been destroyed by geological processes like crustal recycling.
However, more recently, in August 2020, researchers reported that sufficient water to fill the oceans may have always been on the Earth since the beginning of the planet's formation. In this model, atmospheric greenhouse gases kept the oceans from freezing when the newly forming Sun had only 70% of its current luminosity. By , Earth's magnetic field was established, which helped prevent the atmosphere from being stripped away by the solar wind.

Ocean formation

The origin of Earth's oceans is unknown. Oceans are thought to have formed in the Hadean eon and may have been the cause for the emergence of life.

Plate tectonics, post-glacial rebound, and sea level rise continually change the coastline and structure of the world ocean. A global ocean has existed in one form or another on Earth for eons.

Since its formation the ocean has taken many conditions and shapes with many past ocean divisions and potentially at times covering the whole globe.

During colder climatic periods, more ice caps and glaciers form, and enough of the global water supply accumulates as ice to lessen the amounts in other parts of the water cycle. The reverse is true during warm periods. During the last ice age, glaciers covered almost one-third of Earth's land mass with the result being that the oceans were about 122 m (400 ft) lower than today. During the last global "warm spell," about 125,000 years ago, the seas were about 5.5 m (18 ft) higher than they are now. About three million years ago the oceans could have been up to 50 m (165 ft) higher.

Geography

The entire ocean, containing 97% of Earth's water, spans 70.8% of Earth's surface, making it Earth's global ocean or world ocean. This makes Earth, along with its vibrant hydrosphere a "water world" or "ocean world", particularly in Earth's early history when the ocean is thought to have possibly covered Earth completely. The ocean is shaped irregularly, dominating Earth's surface unevenly, allowing the discernment of Earth's surface into a water and land hemisphere, as well as the division of the ocean into particular oceans.

Oceanic divisions

The major oceanic divisions – listed below in descending order of area and volume – are so named based on nearest continents, various archipelagos, and other criteria. Oceans are fringed with coastlines that run for 360,000 kilometres in total distance. They are also connected to smaller, adjoining bodies of water such as, seas, gulfs, bays, bights, and straits.

Ocean basins

The ocean fills Earth's oceanic basins. Earth's oceanic basins cover different geologic provinces of Earth's oceanic crust as well as continental crust. As such it covers mainly Earth's structural basins, but also continental shelfs.

Every ocean basin has a mid-ocean ridge, which creates a long mountain range beneath the ocean. Together they form the global mid-oceanic ridge system that features the longest mountain range in the world. This underwater mountain range is several times longer than the longest continental mountain range—the Andes.

Oceanographers state that less than 20% of the oceans have been mapped.

Physical properties

Color

Water cycle, weather and rainfall

Ocean water represents the largest body of water within the global water cycle (oceans contain 97% of Earth's water). Evaporation from the ocean moves water into the atmosphere to later rain back down onto land and the ocean. Oceans have a significant effect on the biosphere. The ocean as a whole is thought to cover approximately 90% of the Earth's biosphere. Oceanic evaporation, as a phase of the water cycle, is the source of most rainfall (about 90%), causing a global cloud cover of 67% and a consistent oceanic cloud cover of 72%. Ocean temperatures affect climate and wind patterns that affect life on land. One of the most dramatic forms of weather occurs over the oceans: tropical cyclones (also called "typhoons" and "hurricanes" depending upon where the system forms).

As the world's ocean is the principal component of Earth's hydrosphere, it is integral to life on Earth, forms part of the carbon cycle and water cycle, and – as a huge heat reservoir – influences climate and weather patterns.

Waves and swell

The motions of the ocean surface, known as undulations or wind waves, are the partial and alternate rising and falling of the ocean surface. The series of mechanical waves that propagate along the interface between water and air is called swell – a term used in sailing, surfing and navigation. These motions profoundly affect ships on the surface of the ocean and the well-being of people on those ships who might suffer from sea sickness.

Wind blowing over the surface of a body of water forms waves that are perpendicular to the direction of the wind. The friction between air and water caused by a gentle breeze on a pond causes ripples to form. A strong blow over the ocean causes larger waves as the moving air pushes against the raised ridges of water. The waves reach their maximum height when the rate at which they are travelling nearly matches the speed of the wind. In open water, when the wind blows continuously as happens in the Southern Hemisphere in the Roaring Forties, long, organized masses of water called swell roll across the ocean. If the wind dies down, the wave formation is reduced, but already-formed waves continue to travel in their original direction until they meet land. The size of the waves depends on the fetch, the distance that the wind has blown over the water and the strength and duration of that wind. When waves meet others coming from different directions, interference between the two can produce broken, irregular seas.

Constructive interference can cause individual (unexpected) rogue waves much higher than normal. Rogue waves, however, have been documented at heights above .

The top of a wave is known as the crest, the lowest point between waves is the trough and the distance between the crests is the wavelength. The wave is pushed across the surface of the ocean by the wind, but this represents a transfer of energy and not horizontal movement of water. As waves approach land and move into shallow water, they change their behavior. If approaching at an angle, waves may bend (refraction) or wrap around rocks and headlands (diffraction). When the wave reaches a point where its deepest oscillations of the water contact the ocean floor, they begin to slow down. This pulls the crests closer together and increases the waves' height, which is called wave shoaling. When the ratio of the wave's height to the water depth increases above a certain limit, it "breaks", toppling over in a mass of foaming water. This rushes in a sheet up the beach before retreating into the ocean under the influence of gravity.

Earthquakes, volcanic eruptions or other major geological disturbances can set off waves that can lead to tsunamis in coastal areas which can be very dangerous.

Sea level and surface
The ocean's surface is an important reference point for oceanography and geography, particularly as mean sea level. The ocean surface has globally little, but measurable topography, depending on the ocean's volumes.

The ocean surface is a crucial interface for oceanic and atmospheric processes. Allowing interchange of particles, enriching the air and water, as well as grounds by some particles becoming sediments. This interchange has fertilized life in the ocean, on land and air. These processes and components altogether form ocean surface ecosystems.

Tides

Tides are the regular rise and fall in water level experienced by oceans in response to the gravitational influences of the moon and the sun, and the effects of the Earth's rotation. During each tidal cycle, at any given place the water rises to a maximum height known as "high tide" before ebbing away again to the minimum "low tide" level. As the water recedes, it uncovers more and more of the foreshore, also known as the intertidal zone. The difference in height between the high tide and low tide is known as the tidal range or tidal amplitude.

In the open ocean tidal ranges are less than 1 meter, but in coastal areas these tidal ranges increase to more than 10 meters in some areas. Some of the largest tidal ranges in the world occur in the Bay of Fundy and Ungava Bay in Canada, reaching up to 16 meters. Other locations with record high tidal ranges include the Bristol Channel between England and Wales, Cook Inlet in Alaska, and the Río Gallegos in Argentina.

Most places experience two high tides each day, occurring at intervals of about 12 hours and 25 minutes. This is half the 24 hours and 50 minute period that it takes for the Earth to make a complete revolution and return the moon to its previous position relative to an observer. Tidal force or tide-raising force decreases rapidly with distance, so the moon has more than twice as great an effect on tides as the Sun. When the sun, moon and Earth are all aligned (full moon and new moon), the combined effect results in the high "spring tides". A storm surge can occur when high winds pile water up against the coast in a shallow area and this, coupled with a low pressure system, can raise the surface of the ocean at high tide dramatically.

Depth

The average depth of the oceans is about 4 km. "Deep ocean," which is anything below 200 meters (660 ft.), covers about 66% of Earth's surface. This figure does not include seas not connected to the World Ocean, such as the Caspian Sea.

The deepest point in the ocean is the Mariana Trench, located in the Pacific Ocean near the Northern Mariana Islands. Its maximum depth has been estimated to be . The British naval vessel Challenger II surveyed the trench in 1951 and named the deepest part of the trench the "Challenger Deep". In 1960, the Trieste successfully reached the bottom of the trench, manned by a crew of two men.

Oceanic zones 

Oceanographers divide the ocean into different vertical and horizontal zones defined by physical and biological conditions. The pelagic zone consists of the water column of the open ocean, and can be divided into further regions categorized by light abundance and by depth.

Grouped by light penetration 

 The photic zone includes the oceans from the surface to a depth of 200 m; it is the region where photosynthesis can occur and is, therefore, the most biodiverse. Photosynthesis by plants and microscopic algae (free floating phytoplankton) allows the creation of organic matter from chemical precursors including water and carbon dioxide. This organic matter can then be consumed by other creatures. Much of the organic matter created in the photic zone is consumed there but some sinks into deeper waters.
 Below the photic zone is the mesopelagic or twilight zone where there is a very small amount of light. Below that is the aphotic deep ocean to which no surface sunlight at all penetrates. Life that exists deeper than the photic zone must either rely on material sinking from above (see marine snow) or find another energy source. Hydrothermal vents are a source of energy in what is known as the aphotic zone (depths exceeding 200 m). The pelagic part of the photic zone is known as the epipelagic.

Grouped by depth and temperature 
The pelagic part of the aphotic zone can be further divided into vertical regions according to depth and temperature:

 The mesopelagic is the uppermost region.
 The benthic zones are aphotic and correspond to the three deepest zones of the deep-sea. The abyssal zone covers the abyssal plains between 4,000 and 6,000 m. Lastly, the hadal zone corresponds to the hadalpelagic zone, which is found in oceanic trenches.

Distinct boundaries between ocean surface waters and deep waters can be drawn based on the properties of the water. These boundaries are called thermoclines (temperature), haloclines (salinity), chemoclines (chemistry), and pycnoclines (density). If a zone undergoes dramatic changes in temperature with depth, it contains a thermocline, a distinct boundary between warmer surface water and colder deep water. The tropical thermocline is typically deeper than the thermocline at higher latitudes. Polar waters, which receive relatively little solar energy, are not stratified by temperature and generally lack a thermocline because surface water at polar latitudes are nearly as cold as water at greater depths. Below the thermocline, water everywhere in the ocean is very cold, ranging from −1 °C to 3 °C. Because this deep and cold layer contains the bulk of ocean water, the average temperature of the world ocean is 3.9 °C. If a zone undergoes dramatic changes in salinity with depth, it contains a halocline. If a zone undergoes a strong, vertical chemistry gradient with depth, it contains a chemocline. Temperature and salinity control the density of ocean water, with colder and saltier water being more dense, and this density in turn regulates the global water circulation within the ocean. The halocline often coincides with the thermocline, and the combination produces a pronounced pycnocline, a boundary between less dense surface water and dense deep water.

Grouped by distance from land 
The pelagic zone can be further subdivided into two sub regions based on distance from land: the neritic zone and the oceanic zone. The neritic zone encompasses the water mass directly above the continental shelves and hence includes coastal waters, whereas the oceanic zone includes all the completely open water.

The littoral zone covers the region between low and high tide and represents the transitional area between marine and terrestrial conditions. It is also known as the intertidal zone because it is the area where tide level affects the conditions of the region.

Volumes 
The volume of water in all the oceans together is approximately 1.335 billion cubic kilometers (1.335 sextillion liters, 320.3 million cubic miles).

Temperature 

Ocean temperatures depends on the amount of solar radiation falling on its surface. There is a continuous circulation of water in the oceans. Warm surface currents cool as they move away from the tropics, and the water becomes denser and sinks. The cold water moves back towards the equator as a deep sea current, driven by changes in the temperature and density of the water, before eventually welling up again towards the surface.

Temperature and salinity by region 
The waters in different regions of the ocean have quite different temperature and salinity characteristics. This is due to differences in the local water balance (precipitation vs. evaporation) and the "sea to air" temperature gradients. These characteristics can vary widely among ocean regions. The table below provides an illustration of the sort of values usually encountered.

Sea ice 

Seawater with a typical salinity of 35‰ has a freezing point of about −1.8 °C (28.8 °F). Because sea ice is less dense than water, it floats on the ocean's surface (as does fresh water ice, which has an even lower density). Sea ice covers about 7% of the Earth's surface and about 12% of the world's oceans. Sea ice usually starts to freeze at the very surface, initially as a very thin ice film. As further freezing takes place, this ice film thickens and can form ice sheets. The ice formed incorporates some sea salt, but much less than the seawater it forms from. As the ice forms with low salinity this results in saltier residual seawater. This in turn increases density and promotes vertical sinking of the water.

Ocean currents and global climate

Types of ocean currents 
An ocean current is a continuous, directed movement of seawater generated by a number of forces acting upon the water, including wind, the Coriolis effect, temperature and salinity differences. Ocean currents are primarily horizontal water movements. They have different origins, such as tides for tidal currents, or wind and waves for surface currents.

Tidal currents are in phase with the tide, hence are quasiperiodic; associated with the influence of the moon and sun pull on the ocean water. Tidal currents may form various complex patterns in certain places, most notably around headlands. Non-periodic or non-tidal currents are created by the action of winds and changes in density of water. In littoral zones, breaking waves are so intense and the depth measurement so low, that maritime currents reach often 1 to 2 knots.

The wind and waves create surface currents (designated as "drift currents"). These currents can decompose in one quasi-permanent current (which varies within the hourly scale) and one movement of Stokes drift under the effect of rapid waves movement (which vary on timescales of a couple of seconds). The quasi-permanent current is accelerated by the breaking of waves, and in a lesser governing effect, by the friction of the wind on the surface.

This acceleration of the current takes place in the direction of waves and dominant wind. Accordingly, when the ocean depth increases, the rotation of the earth changes the direction of currents in proportion with the increase of depth, while friction lowers their speed. At a certain ocean depth, the current changes direction and is seen inverted in the opposite direction with current speed becoming null: known as the Ekman spiral. The influence of these currents is mainly experienced at the mixed layer of the ocean surface, often from 400 to 800 meters of maximum depth. These currents can considerably change and are dependent on the yearly seasons. If the mixed layer is less thick (10 to 20 meters), the quasi-permanent current at the surface can adopt quite a different direction in relation to the direction of the wind. In this case, the water column becomes virtually homogeneous above the thermocline.

The wind blowing on the ocean surface will set the water in motion. The global pattern of winds (also called atmospheric circulation) creates a global pattern of ocean currents. These are driven not only by the wind but also by the effect of the circulation of the earth (coriolis force). Theses major ocean currents include the Gulf Stream, Kuroshio current, Agulhas current and Antarctic Circumpolar Current. The Antarctic Circumpolar Current encircles Antarctica and influences the area's climate as well as connecting currents in several oceans.

Relationship of currents and climate 

Collectively, currents move enormous amounts of water and heat around the globe influencing climate. These wind driven currents are largely confined to the top hundreds of meters of the ocean. At greater depth the drivers of water motion are the thermohaline circulation (the Atlantic meridional overturning circulation (AMOC) is part of a global thermoholine circulation). This is driven by the cooling of surface waters at northern and southern polar latitudes creating dense water which sinks to the bottom of the ocean. This cold and dense water moves slowly away from the poles which is why the waters in the deepest layers of the world ocean are so cold. This deep ocean water circulation is relatively slow and water at the bottom of the ocean can be isolated from the ocean surface and atmosphere for hundreds or even a few thousand years. This circulation has important impacts on global climate and the uptake and redistribution of pollutants such as carbon dioxide by moving these contaminants from the surface into the deep ocean.

Ocean currents greatly affect Earth's climate by transferring heat from the tropics to the polar regions and thereby also affecting air temperature and precipitation in coastal regions and further inland. Surface heat and freshwater fluxes create global density gradients that drive the thermohaline circulation part of large-scale ocean circulation. It plays an important role in supplying heat to the polar regions, and thus in sea ice regulation.

Oceans moderate the climate of locations where prevailing winds blow in from the ocean. At similar latitudes, a place on Earth with more influence from the ocean will have a more moderate climate than a place with more influence from land. For example, the cities San Francisco (37.8 N) and New York (40.7 N) have different climates because San Francisco has more influence from the ocean. San Francisco, on the west coast of North America, gets winds from the west over the Pacific Ocean, and the influence of the ocean water yields a more moderate climate with a warmer winter and a longer, cooler summer, with the warmest temperatures happening later in the year. New York, on the east coast of North America gets winds from the west over land, so New York has colder winters and hotter, earlier summers than San Francisco.

Warmer ocean currents yield warmer climates in the long term, even at high latitudes. At similar latitudes, a place influenced by warm ocean currents will have a warmer climate overall than a place influenced by cold ocean currents. French Riviera (43.5 N) and Rockland, Maine (44.1 N) have same latitude, but the French Riviera is influenced by warm waters transported by the Gulf Stream into the Mediterranean Sea and has a warmer climate overall. Maine is influenced by cold waters transported south by the Labrador Current giving it a colder climate overall.

Changes in the thermohaline circulation are thought to have significant impacts on Earth's energy budget. Since the thermohaline circulation governs the rate at which deep waters reach the surface, it may also significantly influence atmospheric carbon dioxide concentrations. Modern observations, climate simulations and paleoclimate reconstructions suggest that the Atlantic Meridional Overturning Circulation (AMOC) has weakened since the preindustrial era. The latest climate change projections in 2021 suggest that the AMOC is likely to weaken further over the 21st century. Such a weakening could cause large changes to global climate, with the North Atlantic particularly vulnerable.

Chemical composition of seawater

Salinity

Salinity is a measure of the total amounts of dissolved salts in seawater. It was originally measured via measurement of the amount of chloride in seawater and hence termed chlorinity. It is now routinely measured by measuring electrical conductivity of the water sample. Salinity can be calculated using the chlorinity, which is a measure of the total mass of halogen ions (includes fluorine, chlorine, bromine, and iodine) in seawater. By international agreement, the following formula is used to determine salinity:

Salinity (in ‰) = 1.80655 × Chlorinity (in ‰)

The average ocean water chlorinity is about 19.2‰, and, thus, the average salinity is around 34.7‰.

Salinity has a major influence on the density of seawater. A zone of rapid salinity increase with depth is called a halocline. The temperature of maximum density of seawater decreases as its salt content increases. Freezing temperature of water decreases with salinity, and boiling temperature of water increases with salinity. Typical seawater freezes at around −2 °C at atmospheric pressure.

Salinity is higher in Earth's oceans where there is more evaporation and lower where there is more precipitation. If precipitation exceeds evaporation, as is the case in polar and some temperate regions, salinity will be lower. If evaporation exceeds precipitation, as is sometimes the case in tropical regions, salinity will be higher. For example, evaporation is greater than precipitation in the Mediterranean Sea, which has an average salinity of 38‰, more saline than the global average of 34.7‰. Thus, oceanic waters in polar regions have lower salinity content than oceanic waters tropical regions. However, when sea ice forms at high latitudes, salt is excluded from the ice as it forms, which can increase the salinity in the residual seawater in polar regions such as the Arctic Ocean.

Observations of sea surface salinity between 1950 to 2019 indicate that due to the effects of climate change on oceans regions of high salinity and evaporation have become more saline, while regions of low salinity and more precipitation have become fresher. It is very likely that the Pacific and Antarctic/Southern Oceans have freshened while the Atlantic has become more saline.

Dissolved gases 

Ocean water contains large quantities of dissolved gases, including oxygen, carbon dioxide and nitrogen. These dissolve into ocean water via gas exchange at the ocean surface, with the solubility of these gases depending on the temperature and salinity of the water. The four most abundant gases in earth's atmosphere and oceans are nitrogen, oxygen, argon, and carbon dioxide. In the ocean by volume, the most abundant gases dissolved in seawater are carbon dioxide (including bicarbonate and carbonate ions, 14 mL/L on average), nitrogen (9 mL/L), and oxygen (5 mL/L) at equilibrium at   All gases are more soluble – more easily dissolved – in colder water than in warmer water. For example, when salinity and pressure are held constant, oxygen concentration in water almost doubles when the temperature drops from that of a warm summer day  to freezing . Similarly, carbon dioxide and nitrogen gases are more soluble at colder temperatures, and their solubility changes with temperature at different rates.

Oxygen, photosynthesis and carbon cycling 

The process of photosynthesis in the surface ocean releases oxygen and consumes carbon dioxide. This photosynthesis in the ocean is dominated by phytoplankton, microscopic free floating algae. After the plants grow, bacterial decomposition of the organic matter formed by photosynthesis in the ocean consumes oxygen and releases carbon dioxide. The sinking and bacterial decomposition of some organic matter in deep ocean water, at depths where the waters are out of contact with the atmosphere, leads to a reduction in oxygen concentrations and increase in carbon dioxide, carbonate and bicarbonate. This cycling of carbon dioxide in oceans is an important part of the global carbon cycle.

The increasing carbon dioxide concentrations in the atmosphere due to fossil fuel combustion lead to higher concentrations in the ocean waters and ocean acidification. Dissolving atmospheric carbon dioxide reacts with bicarbonate and carbonate ions in seawater to shift the chemical balance of the water, making it more acidic. The oceans represent a major sink for carbon dioxide taken up from the atmosphere by photosynthesis and by dissolution. There is also increasing attention focused on carbon dioxide uptake in coastal marine habitats such as mangroves and saltmarshes, a process sometimes referred to as “Blue carbon”. Attention is focused on these ecosystems because they are strong carbon sinks as well as ecologically important habitats under considerable threat from human activities and environmental degradation.

As deep ocean water circulates throughout the globe, it contains gradually less oxygen and gradually more carbon dioxide with more time away from the air at the surface. This gradual decrease in oxygen concentration happens as sinking organic matter continuously gets decomposed during the time the water is out of contact with the atmosphere. Most of the deep waters of the ocean still contain relatively high concentrations of oxygen sufficient for most animals to survive. However, some ocean areas have very low oxygen due to long periods of isolation of the water from the atmosphere. These oxygen deficient areas, called oxygen minimum zones or hypoxic waters, could be made worse by the effects of climate change on oceans.

Residence times of chemical elements and ions 

The ocean waters contain many chemical elements as dissolved ions. Elements dissolved in ocean waters have a wide range of concentrations. Some elements have very high concentrations of several grams per liter, such as sodium and chloride, together making up the majority of ocean salts. Other elements, such as iron, are present at tiny concentrations of just a few nanograms (10−9 grams) per liter.

The concentration of any element depends on its rate of supply to the ocean and its rate of removal. Elements enter the ocean from rivers, the atmosphere and hydrothermal vents. Elements are removed from ocean water by sinking and becoming buried in sediments or evaporating to the atmosphere in the case of water and some gases.  Oceanographers consider the balance of input and removal by estimating the residence time of an element. Residence time is the average time the element would spend dissolved in the ocean before it is removed. Very abundant elements in ocean water like sodium have high rates of input, reflecting high abundance in rocks and relatively rapid rock weathering, coupled to very slow removal from the ocean because sodium ions are rather unreactive and very soluble. In contrast, other elements such as iron and aluminium are abundant in rocks but very insoluble, meaning that inputs to the ocean are low and removal is rapid. These cycles represent part of the major global cycle of elements that has gone on since the Earth first formed. The residence times of the very abundant elements in the ocean are estimated to be millions of years, while for highly reactive and insoluble elements, residence times are only hundreds of years.

Nutrients 

A few elements such as nitrogen, phosphorus, iron, and potassium are essential for life, are major components of biological material, and are commonly called “nutrients”. Nitrate and phosphate have ocean residence times of 10,000 and 69,000  years, respectively, while potassium is a much more abundant ion in the ocean with a residence time of 12 million years. The biological cycling of these elements means that this represents a continuous removal process from the ocean's water column as degrading organic material sinks to the ocean floor as sediment.

Phosphate from intensive agriculture and untreated sewage is transported via runoff to rivers and coastal zones to the ocean where it is metabolized. Eventually, it sinks to the ocean floor and is no longer available to humans as a commercial resource. Production of rock phosphate, an essential ingredient in inorganic fertilizer is a slow geological process occurring in some of the world's ocean sediments thus making minable sedimentary apatite (phosphate) in effect a non-renewable resource (see peak phosphorus). This continuous net deposition loss of non-renewable phosphate from human activities may become a resource problem in the future for fertilizer production and food security.

Marine life 

Life within the ocean evolved 3 billion years prior to life on land. Both the depth and the distance from shore strongly influence the biodiversity of the plants and animals present in each region. The diversity of life in the ocean is immense, including:
 Animals: most animal phyla have species that inhabit the ocean, including many that are found only in marine environments such as sponges, Cnidaria (such as corals and jellyfish), comb jellies, Brachiopods, and Echinoderms (such as sea urchins and sea stars). Many other familiar animal groups primarily live in the ocean, including cephalopods (includes octopus and squid), crustaceans (includes lobsters, crabs, and shrimp), fish, sharks, cetaceans (includes whales, dolphins, and porpoises). In addition, many land animals have adapted to living a major part of their life on the oceans. For instance, seabirds are a diverse group of birds that have adapted to a life mainly on the oceans. They feed on marine animals and spend most of their lifetime on water, many going on land only for breeding. Other birds that have adapted to oceans as their living space are penguins, seagulls and pelicans. Seven species of turtles, the sea turtles, also spend most of their time in the oceans.
Plants: including sea grasses, or mangroves
Algae: algae is a "catch-all" term to include many photosynthetic, single-celled eukaryotes, such as green algae, diatoms, and dinoflagellates, but also multicellular algae, such as some red algae (including organisms like Pyropia, which is the source of the edible nori seaweed), and brown algae (including organisms like kelp).
Bacteria: ubiquitous single-celled prokaryotes found throughout the world
 Archaea: prokaryotes distinct from bacteria, that inhabit many environments of the ocean, as well as many extreme environments
 Fungi: many marine fungi with diverse roles are found in oceanic environments

Human uses of the oceans

The ocean has been linked to human activity throughout history. These activities serve a wide variety of purposes, including navigation and exploration, naval warfare, travel, shipping and trade, food production (e.g. fishing, whaling, seaweed farming, aquaculture), leisure (cruising, sailing, recreational boat fishing, scuba diving), power generation (see marine energy and offshore wind power), extractive industries (offshore drilling and deep sea mining), freshwater production via desalination.

Many of the world's goods are moved by ship between the world's seaports. Large quantities of goods are transported across the ocean, especially across the Atlantic and around the Pacific Rim. A lot of cargo, such as manufactured goods, is usually transported within standard sized, lockable containers, loaded on purpose-built container ships at dedicated terminals. Containerization greatly increased the efficiency and decreased the cost of moving goods by sea, and was a major factor leading to the rise of globalization and exponential increases in international trade in the mid-to-late 20th century.

Oceans are also the major supply source for the fishing industry. Some of the major harvests are shrimp, fish, crabs, and lobster. The biggest commercial fishery globally is for anchovies, Alaska pollock and tuna. A report by FAO in 2020 stated that "in 2017, 34 percent of the fish stocks of the world's marine fisheries were classified as overfished". Fish and other fishery products from both wild fisheries and aquaculture are among the most widely consumed sources of protein and other essential nutrients. Data in 2017 showed that "fish consumption accounted for 17 percent of the global population's intake of animal proteins". In order to fulfill this need, coastal countries have exploited marine resources in their exclusive economic zone, although fishing vessels are increasingly venturing further afield to exploit stocks in international waters.

The ocean offers a very large supply of energy carried by ocean waves, tides, salinity differences, and ocean temperature differences which can be harnessed to generate electricity. Forms of sustainable marine energy include tidal power, ocean thermal energy and wave power. Offshore wind power is captured by wind turbines placed out on the ocean; it has the advantage that wind speeds are higher than on land, though wind farms are more costly to construct offshore. There are large deposits of petroleum, as oil and natural gas, in rocks beneath the ocean floor. Offshore platforms and drilling rigs extract the oil or gas and store it for transport to land.

"Freedom of the seas" is a principle in international law dating from the seventeenth century. It stresses freedom to navigate the oceans and disapproves of war fought in international waters. Today, this concept is enshrined in the United Nations Convention on the Law of the Sea (UNCLOS).

There are two major international legal organizations that are involved in ocean governance on a global scale, namely the International Maritime Organization and the United Nations. The International Maritime Organization (IMO), which was ratified in 1958 is responsible mainly for maritime safety, liability and compensation and they have held some conventions on marine pollution related to shipping incidents. Ocean governance is the conduct of the policy, actions and affairs regarding the world's oceans.

Threats from human activities

Human activities affect marine life and marine habitats through many negative influences, such as marine pollution (including marine debris and microplastics) overfishing, ocean acidification and other effects of climate change on oceans.

Climate change

Marine pollution

Plastic pollution

Overfishing

Protection

Protecting Earth's oceans ecosystem/s against its recognized threats is a major component of environmental protection and is closely related to sustainable development. One of its main techniques is the creation and enforcement of marine protected areas (MPAs). Other techniques may include standardized product certifications, supply chain transparency requirements policies, policies to prevent marine pollution, eco-tariffs, research and development, ecosystem-assistance (e.g. for coral reefs), support for sustainable seafood (e.g. sustainable fishing practices and types of aquaculture), banning and systematically obstructing (e.g. via higher costs policies) unsustainable ocean use and associated industries (e.g. cruise ship travel, certain shipping practices), monitoring, revising waste management of plastics and fashion industry pollutants, protection of marine resources and components whose extraction or disturbance would cause substantial harm, engagement of broader publics and impacted communities, novel decision-making mechanisms, and the development of ocean clean-up projects. Ocean protection serves to i.a. protect human health and to safeguard stable conditions of this natural ecosystem upon which humans depend.

It may be necessary to consider marine protection within a national, regional and international context.

In 2021, 43 expert scientists published the first scientific framework version that – via integration, review, clarifications and standardization – enables the evaluation of levels of protection of marine protected areas and can serve as a guide for any subsequent efforts to improve, plan and monitor marine protection quality and  extents. Examples are the efforts towards the 30%-protection-goal of the "Global Deal For Nature" and the UN's Sustainable Development Goal 14 ("life below water").

Global Ocean Treaty 
In March 2023 a Global Ocean Treaty was signed. Greenpeace called it "the biggest conservation victory ever". The main achievement is the new possibility to create marine protected areas in international waters. By doing so the agreement now makes it possible to protect 30% of the oceans by 2030 (part of the 30 by 30 target).

Extraterrestrial oceans

Extraterrestrial oceans may be composed of water or other elements and compounds. The only confirmed large stable bodies of extraterrestrial surface liquids are the lakes of Titan, which are made of hydrocarbons instead of water. However, there is strong evidence for subsurface water oceans' existence elsewhere in the Solar System. The best-established candidates for subsurface water oceans in the Solar System are Jupiter's moons Europa, Ganymede, and Callisto; and Saturn's moons Enceladus and Titan.

Although Earth is the only known planet with large stable bodies of liquid water on its surface and the only one in the Solar System, other celestial bodies are thought to have large oceans. In June 2020, NASA scientists reported that it is likely that exoplanets with oceans may be common in the Milky Way galaxy, based on mathematical modeling studies.

The inner structure of gas giants remain poorly understood. Scientists suspect that, under extreme pressure, hydrogen would act as a supercritical fluid, hence the likelihood of oceans of liquid hydrogen deep in the interior of gas giants like Jupiter.

Oceans of liquid carbon have been hypothesized to exist on ice giants, notably Neptune and Uranus.

See also

European Atlas of the Seas
Land and water hemispheres
List of seas
Marine heatwave
World Ocean Atlas
World Oceans Day

References

External links

FAO (Food and Agriculture Organization of the United Nations) Fisheries Division
NOAA – National Oceanic and Atmospheric Administration (United States)
United Nations Decade of Ocean Science for Sustainable Development (2021–2030)

 
Oceans
Coastal and oceanic landforms
Bodies of water
Articles containing video clips